Louise Clarke Pyrnelle (June 19, 1850 – August 26, 1907) was an Alabama writer. Her works drew heavily from her childhood experiences growing up on an antebellum plantation.

Life
Pyrnelle was born Elizabeth Louise Clarke on a cotton plantation in Perry County, Alabama. After the Civil War, the family moved to Dallas County, Alabama, where her father opened a medical practice.  She was educated in lecturing, and worked as a governess and public speaker.

In 1880 she married John Parnell. Her novel Diddie, Dumps & Tot; or plantation child-life was published in 1882 under the pseudonym "Pyrnelle" – a slight variation on her husband's name. She would publish only one other work during her lifetime: a story called "Aunt Flora's Courtship and Marriage".  She died in 1907.

Works
Diddie, Dumps & Tot; or plantation child-life, 1882
This novel was noted at the time for its use of the southern black vernacular, a dialect also used by Mark Twain and Joel Chandler Harris, and which was thought to add "authenticity" to writing about the American South. The novel offered a nostalgic and romanticized view of antebellum plantation life, and was popular during the 19th and 20th centuries.
Miss Li'l' Tweetty, 1917
This posthumously published novel describes the childhood experiences of a young girl named 'Tweetty'.  Like Diddie, Dumps & Tot, its depictions of slavery were uncritical and nostalgic.

References

External links
 
 
 

1850 births
1907 deaths
19th-century American novelists
American women novelists
Novelists from Alabama
19th-century American women writers